A kitbag question (Hebrew: she'elat kitbag) is a question that is better not asked and might bring about undesirable consequences, usually directed to a person of authority. The person asking the question (or other people) are likely to be harmed by the very act of asking the question.

The kitbag question is a classic topic in decision theory.

Origin
The expression was created when soldiers in the Israel Defence Forces, who had been commanded by their superiors to assemble for a loaded march with their weapons and ammunition vests, asked their superiors whether they should also bring their kitbag. The reply was "good idea, bring the kitbag as well". Yet if they had not asked, the commanders would never have thought to require bringing the kitbag.

The expression began in Israeli army slang, then spread to Israeli society in general, and now has a limited degree of international use.

Examples

Kitbag questions come in two main categories:
 Questions about a task which the questioner must perform, but he/she asks the question in hope of sparking a modification or cancellation of the task.
 Questions about unclear instructions. In this case, the questioner has a dilemma: on one hand, he/she wishes to clarify the instructions in order to fulfill them better. On the other hand, the very act of asking is likely to make the instructions more severe.

Kitbag questions can also occur in non-military contexts. A common example is approaching government authorities in order to receive documents (such as a construction permit for a building). It often seems likely that if the questioner asks the authorities whether he/she must bring a particular document, the answer will always be "yes", whether or not the document is really needed.

References

Hebrew slang